LHA may refer to:
Flughafen Lahr (IATA code)
 LHA (for [Leading Helicopter Academies]), "Raising flying standards in Europe"
 LHA (for "Landing Helicopter Assault"), US Navy hull classification symbol for the general purpose helicopter-carrying amphibious assault ships of the America classes.
 Lateral hypothalamic area, a part of the brain that has been implicated in the control of feeding behavior
 Lesbian Herstory Archives, a New York–based lesbian history archive and museum.
 Lha, a letter of Cyrillic alphabet
 LHA (file format), a freeware compression utility and associated file format
 Lincoln Highway Association
 Livonia Hockey Association, amateur hockey league in Livonia, Michigan
 LHA, the local hour angle of an astronomical object
 Local Housing Allowance, welfare benefit in the UK to help tenants with low incomes pay their rent
 Stock ticker for Lufthansa on the Frankfurt Stock Exchange
 LaurenHill Academy, in Saint-Laurent, Montreal